

Events

Pre-1600
AD 81 – Domitian becomes Emperor of the Roman Empire upon the death of his brother Titus.
 629 – Emperor Heraclius enters Constantinople in triumph after his victory over the Persian Empire.
 786 – "Night of the three Caliphs": Harun al-Rashid becomes the Abbasid caliph upon the death of his brother al-Hadi. Birth of Harun's son al-Ma'mun.
 919 – Battle of Islandbridge: High King Niall Glúndub is killed while leading an Irish coalition against the Vikings of Uí Ímair, led by King Sitric Cáech.
1180 – Genpei War: Battle of Ishibashiyama in Japan.
1226 – The first recorded instance of the Catholic practice of perpetual Eucharistic adoration formally begins in Avignon, France.
1402 – Battle of Homildon Hill results in an English victory over Scotland.

1601–1900
1607 – Flight of the Earls from Lough Swilly, Donegal, Ireland.
1682 – Bishop Gore School, one of the oldest schools in Wales, is founded.
1723 – Grand Master António Manoel de Vilhena lays down the first stone of Fort Manoel in Malta.
1741 – George Frideric Handel completes his oratorio Messiah.
1752 – The British Empire adopts the Gregorian calendar, skipping eleven days (the previous day was September 2).
1763 – Seneca warriors defeat British forces at the Battle of Devil's Hole during Pontiac's War.
1782 – American Revolutionary War: Review of the French troops under General Rochambeau by General George Washington at Verplanck's Point, New York.
1791 – The Papal States lose Avignon to Revolutionary France.
1808 – Finnish War: Russians defeat the Swedes at the Battle of Oravais.
1812 – Napoleonic Wars: The French Grande Armée enters Moscow. The Fire of Moscow begins as soon as Russian troops leave the city.
1814 – Battle of Baltimore: The poem Defence of Fort McHenry is written by Francis Scott Key. The poem is later used as the lyrics of The Star-Spangled Banner.
1829 – The Ottoman Empire signs the Treaty of Adrianople with Russia, thus ending the Russo-Turkish War.
1846 – Jang Bahadur and his brothers massacre about 40 members of the Nepalese palace court.
1862 – American Civil War: The Battle of South Mountain, part of the Maryland Campaign, is fought.

1901–present
1901 – U.S. President William McKinley dies after being mortally wounded on September 6 by anarchist Leon Czolgosz and is succeeded by Vice President Theodore Roosevelt.
1911 – Russian Premier Pyotr Stolypin is shot by Dmitry Bogrov while attending a performance of Rimsky-Korsakov's The Tale of Tsar Saltan at the Kiev Opera House, in the presence of Tsar Nicholas II.
1914 – , the Royal Australian Navy's first submarine, is lost at sea with all hands near East New Britain, Papua New Guinea.
1917 – The Russian Empire is formally replaced by the Russian Republic.
1936 – Raoul Villain, who assassinated the French Socialist Jean Jaurès, is himself killed by Spanish Republicans in Ibiza.
1939 – World War II: The Estonian military boards the Polish submarine  in Tallinn, sparking a diplomatic incident that the Soviet Union will later use to justify the annexation of Estonia.
1940 – Ip massacre: The Hungarian Army, supported by local Hungarians, kill 158 Romanian civilians in Ip, Sălaj, a village in Northern Transylvania, an act of ethnic cleansing.
1943 – World War II: The Wehrmacht starts a three-day retaliatory operation targeting several Greek villages in the region of Viannos, whose death toll would eventually exceed 500 persons.
1944 – World War II: Maastricht becomes the first Dutch city to be liberated by allied forces.
1948 – The Indian Army captures the city of Aurangabad as part of Operation Polo.
1954 – In a top secret nuclear test, a Soviet Tu-4 bomber drops a 40 kiloton atomic weapon just north of Totskoye village.
1958 – The first two German post-war rockets, designed by the German engineer Ernst Mohr, reach the upper atmosphere.
1960 – The Organization of Petroleum Exporting Countries (OPEC) is founded.
  1960   – Congo Crisis: Mobutu Sese Seko seizes power in a military coup, suspending parliament and the constitution.
1975 – The first American saint, Elizabeth Ann Seton, is canonized by Pope Paul VI.
1979 – Afghan leader Nur Muhammad Taraki is assassinated upon the order of Hafizullah Amin, who becomes the new General Secretary of the People's Democratic Party.
1982 – President-elect of Lebanon Bachir Gemayel is assassinated.
1984 – Joe Kittinger becomes the first person to fly a gas balloon alone across the Atlantic Ocean.
1985 – Penang Bridge, the longest bridge in Malaysia, connecting the island of Penang to the mainland, opens to traffic.
1989 – The Standard Gravure shooting where Joseph T. Wesbecker, a 47-year-old pressman, killed eight people and injured 12 people at his former workplace, Standard Gravure, before committing suicide.
1992 – The Constitutional Court of Bosnia and Herzegovina declares the breakaway Croatian Republic of Herzeg-Bosnia to be illegal.
1993 – Lufthansa Flight 2904, an Airbus A320, crashes into an embankment after overshooting the runway at Okęcie International Airport (now Warsaw Chopin Airport), killing two people.
1994 – The rest of the Major League Baseball season is canceled because of a strike.
1997 – Eighty-one killed as five bogies of the Ahmedabad–Howrah Express plunge into a river in Bilaspur district of Madhya Pradesh, India.
1998 – Telecommunications companies MCI Communications and WorldCom complete their $37 billion merger to form MCI WorldCom.
1999 – Kiribati, Nauru and Tonga join the United Nations.
2000 – Microsoft releases Windows Me.
2001 – Historic National Prayer Service held at Washington National Cathedral for victims of the September 11 attacks. A similar service is held in Canada on Parliament Hill, the largest vigil ever held in the nation's capital. 
2002 – Total Linhas Aéreas Flight 5561 crashes near Paranapanema, Brazil, killing both pilots on board.
2003 – In a referendum, Estonia approves joining the European Union.
  2003   – Bissau-Guinean President Kumba Ialá is ousted from power in a bloodless military coup led by General Veríssimo Correia Seabra.
2007 – Financial crisis of 2007–2008: The Northern Rock bank experiences the first bank run in the United Kingdom in 150 years.
2008 – Aeroflot Flight 821, a Boeing 737-500, crashes into a section of the Trans-Siberian Railway while on approach to Perm International Airport, in Perm, Russia, killing all 88 people on board. 
2015 – The first observation of gravitational waves is made, announced by the LIGO and Virgo collaborations on 11 February 2016.
2019 – Yemen's Houthi rebels claim responsibility for an attack on Saudi Arabian oil facilities.
2022 – Death of Queen Elizabeth II: The Queen's coffin is taken from Buckingham Palace, placed on a gun carriage of The King’s Troop Royal Horse Artillery and moved in a procession to Westminster Hall for her lying in state over the next four days with queues of up to 30 hours stretching for miles along the River Thames.

Births

Pre-1600
 208 – Diadumenian, Roman emperor (d. 218)
 768 – Al-Ma'mun, Abbasid caliph, 7th (d. 833)
 938 – Sahib ibn Abbad, Persian scholar and statesman (d. 995)
 953 – Guo Zongxun, Chinese emperor (d. 973)
1032 – Dao Zong, Chinese emperor (d. 1101)
1246 – John Fitzalan III, English nobleman (d. 1272)
1384 – Ephraim of Nea Makri, Greek martyr and saint (d. 1426)
1388 – Claudius Clavus, Danish geographer and cartographer (d. 1438)
1401 – Maria of Castile, Queen consort of Aragon and Naples (d. 1458)
1485 – Anna of Mecklenburg-Schwerin, Landgravine of Hesse (d. 1525)
1486 – Heinrich Cornelius Agrippa, German theologian, astrologer, and alchemist (d. 1535)
1543 – Claudio Acquaviva, Italian priest, 5th Superior General of the Society of Jesus (d. 1615)
1547 – Johan van Oldenbarnevelt, Dutch politician (d. 1619)
1580 – Francisco de Quevedo, Spanish poet and politician (d. 1645)

1601–1900
1618 – Peter Lely, Dutch-English painter (d. 1680)
1643 – Jeremiah Dummer, American silversmith (d. 1718)
1656 – Thomas Baker, English historian and author (d. 1746)
1713 – Johann Kies, German astronomer and mathematician (d. 1781)
1721 – Eliphalet Dyer, American colonel, lawyer, and politician (d. 1807)
1736 – Robert Raikes, English philanthropist, founded Sunday school (d. 1811)
1737 – Michael Haydn, Austrian singer and composer (d. 1806)
1769 – Alexander von Humboldt, German geographer and explorer (d. 1859)
1774 – Lord William Bentinck, English general and politician, 14th Governor-General of India (d. 1839)
1791 – Franz Bopp, German linguist and academic (d. 1867)
1804 – John Gould, English ornithologist and illustrator (d. 1881)
  1804   – Louis Désiré Maigret, French bishop (d. 1882)
1816 – Mary Hall Barrett Adams, American book editor and letter writer (d. 1860)
1837 – Nikolai Bugaev, Georgian-Russian mathematician and philosopher (d. 1903)
1843 – Lola Rodríguez de Tió, Puerto Rican poet, abolitionist, and women's rights activist (d. 1924)
1847 – Fanny Holland, English actress and singer (d. 1931)
1850 – Anton Mahnič, Slovenian bishop, philosopher, and theologian (d. 1920)
1853 – Ponnambalam Arunachalam, Ceylonese civil servant and politician (d. 1924)
1857 – Julia Platt, American embryologist and politician (d. 1935)
1860 – Hamlin Garland, American novelist, poet, essayist, and short story writer (d. 1940)
1864 – Robert Cecil, 1st Viscount Cecil of Chelwood, English lawyer and politician, Under-Secretary of State for Foreign Affairs, Nobel Prize laureate (d. 1958)
1867 – Charles Dana Gibson, American illustrator (d. 1944)
1868 – Théodore Botrel, French singer-songwriter, poet, and playwright (d. 1925)
1869 – Kid Nichols, American baseball player and manager (d. 1953)
1872 – John Olof Dahlgren, Swedish-American soldier, Medal of Honor recipient (d. 1963)
1879 – Margaret Sanger, American nurse and activist (d. 1966)
1880 – Benjamin, Russian bishop and missionary (d. 1961)
  1880   – Archie Hahn, American sprinter, football player, and coach (d. 1955)
1883 – Richard Gerstl, Austrian painter and illustrator (d. 1908)
1885 – Vittorio Gui, Italian conductor, composer, and critic (d. 1975)
1886 – Jan Masaryk, Czech soldier and politician, Czech Minister of Foreign Affairs (d. 1948)
1887 – Karl Taylor Compton, American physicist (d. 1954)
1891 – Ivan Matveyevich Vinogradov, Russian mathematician and academic (d. 1983)
1892 – Laurence W. Allen, English lieutenant and pilot (d. 1968)
1896 – José Mojica, Mexican tenor and actor (d. 1974)
1898 – Lawrence Gellert, Hungarian-American musicologist and song collector (d. 1979)
  1898   – Ernest Nash, German-Italian photographer and scholar (d. 1974)

1901–present
1902 – Giorgos Papasideris, Greek singer-songwriter (d. 1977)
  1902   – Alice Tully, American soprano and philanthropist (d. 1993)
1903 – Mart Raud, Estonian poet and author (d. 1980)
1904 – Frank Amyot, Canadian sprint canoeist (d. 1962)
  1904   – Richard Mohaupt, German composer and Kapellmeister (d. 1957)
1907 – Yuri Ivask, Russian-American poet and critic (d. 1986)
1909 – Peter Scott, English ornithologist, painter, and sailor (d. 1989)
1910 – Lehman Engel, American composer and conductor (d. 1982)
  1910   – Jack Hawkins, English actor and producer (d. 1973)
  1910   – Yiannis Latsis, Greek businessman (d. 2003)
  1910   – Rolf Liebermann, Swiss-French composer and manager (d. 1999)
  1910   – Rasuna Said, Indonesian women's rights campaigner and national hero (d. 1965)
1911 – William H. Armstrong, American author and educator (d. 1999)
1913 – Jacobo Árbenz, Guatemalan captain and politician, President of Guatemala (d. 1971)
  1913   – Rubby Sherr, American physicist and academic (d. 2013)
1914 – Mae Boren Axton, American composer and educator (d. 1997)
  1914   – Clayton Moore, American actor (d. 1999)
1915 – John Dobson, Chinese-American astronomer and author, designed the Dobsonian telescope (d. 2014)
1916 – Eric Bentley, English-American singer, playwright, and critic (d. 2020)
  1916   – John Heyer, Australian director and producer (d. 2001)
1917 – Rudolf Baumgartner, Swiss violinist and conductor (d. 2002)
1918 – Georges Berger, Belgian race car driver (d. 1967)
  1918   – Cachao López, Cuban-American bassist and composer (d. 2008)
1919 – Deryck Cooke, English musicologist and broadcaster (d. 1976)
  1919   – Gil Langley, Australian cricketer, footballer, and politician (d. 2001)
  1919   – Olga Lowe, South African-English actress (d. 2013)
  1919   – Kay Medford, American actress (d. 1980)
1920 – Mario Benedetti, Uruguayan journalist and author (d. 2009)
  1920   – Lawrence Klein, American economist and academic, Nobel Prize laureate (d. 2013)
  1920   – Alberto Calderón, Argentinian-American mathematician and academic (d. 1998)
1921 – Constance Baker Motley, American lawyer, judge, and politician (d. 2005)
  1921   – A. Jean de Grandpré, Canadian lawyer, businessman, and academic (d. 2022)
  1921   – Paul Poberezny, American pilot and businessman, founded the Experimental Aircraft Association (d. 2013)
  1921   – Dario Vittori, Italian-Argentinian actor and producer (d. 2001)
1922 – Michel Auclair, German-French actor (d. 1988)
  1922   – Frances Bergen, American model and actress (d. 2006)
  1922   – Alfred Käärmann, Estonian soldier and author (d. 2010)
1923 – Nicholas Georgiadis, Greek painter and costume designer (d. 2001)
1924 – Patricia Barringer, American baseball player and accountant (d. 2007)
  1924   – Jerry Coleman, American baseball player and manager (d. 2014)
  1924   – Abioseh Nicol, Sierra Leonean-English physician, academic, and diplomat (d. 1994)
  1924   – Wim Polak, Dutch journalist and politician, Mayor of Amsterdam (d. 1999)
1926 – Michel Butor, French author and critic (d. 2016)
  1926   – Richard Ellsasser, American organist, composer, and conductor (d. 1972)
  1926   – Carmen Franco, 1st Duchess of Franco, Spanish noblewoman (d. 2017)
1927 – Martin Caidin, American author and screenwriter (d. 1997)
  1927   – Janet Davies, English actress (d. 1986)
  1927   – Gardner Dickinson, American golfer (d. 1998)
  1927   – Jim Fanning, American-Canadian baseball player and manager (d. 2015)
  1927   – Edmund Szoka, American cardinal (d. 2014)
1928 – Jay Cameron, American reed player and saxophonist (d. 2001)
  1928   – Alberto Korda, Cuban photographer (d. 2001)
  1928   – Angus Ogilvy, English businessman (d. 2004)
1929 – Larry Collins, American-French journalist, historian, and author (d. 2005)
1930 – Allan Bloom, American philosopher and academic (d. 1992)
  1930   – Romola Costantino, Australian pianist and critic (d. 1988)
  1930   – Eugene I. Gordon, American physicist and engineer (d. 2014)
1932 – Harry Sinden, Canadian ice hockey player, coach, and manager
  1932   – John Tembo, Malawian politician
1933 – Zoe Caldwell, Australian actress (d. 2020)
  1933   – Harve Presnell, American actor and singer (d. 2009)
1934 – Sarah Kofman, French philosopher and academic (d. 1994)
  1934   – Paul Little, New Zealand rugby player (d. 1993)
  1934   – Kate Millett, American author and activist (d. 2017)
  1934   – Don Walser, American singer-songwriter and guitarist (d. 2006)
1935 – Fujio Akatsuka, Japanese illustrator (d. 2008)
1936 – Harry Danielsen, Norwegian educator and politician (d. 2011)
  1936   – Terence Donovan, English photographer and director (d. 1996)
  1936   – Walter Koenig, American actor, producer, and screenwriter
  1936   – Ferid Murad, American physician and pharmacologist, Nobel Prize laureate
  1936   – Lucas Samaras, Greek-American painter and photographer
1937 – Renzo Piano, Italian architect and engineer, designed The Shard and The New York Times Building
1938 – Franco Califano, Libya-born Italian singer-songwriter (d. 2013)
  1938   – Nicol Williamson, Scottish actor (d. 2011)
1939 – DeWitt Weaver, American golfer
1940 – Ventseslav Konstantinov, Bulgarian writer and translator (d. 2019)
  1940   – Larry Brown, American basketball player and coach
1941 – Bruce Hyde, American actor and academic (d. 2015)
  1941   – Ian Kennedy, English lawyer and academic
  1941   – Joan Trumpauer Mulholland, American civil rights activist
  1941   – Alberto Naranjo, Venezuelan drummer, composer, and bandleader (d. 2020)
  1941   – Alex St. Clair, American guitarist and songwriter (d. 2006)
1942 – Oliver Lake, American saxophonist, flute player, and composer
  1942   – Roger Lyons, English trade union leader
  1942   – Bernard MacLaverty, Irish author, playwright, and screenwriter
1943 – Irwin Goodman, Finnish singer-composer and guitarist (d. 1991)
  1943   – Marcos Valle, Brazilian singer-songwriter, pianist, and producer
1944 – Joey Heatherton, American actress, singer, and dancer
  1944   – Günter Netzer, German footballer and manager
1945 – Martin Tyler, English sportscaster
1946 – Pete Agnew, Scottish rock bassist and singer
  1946   – Jim Angle, American soldier and journalist
  1946   – Wolfgang Sühnholz, German-American soccer player and coach (d. 2019)
1947 – Jon Bauman, American singer
  1947   – Sam Neill, Northern Irish-New Zealand actor and director
1948 – Marc Reisner, American environmentalist and author (d. 2000)
1949 – Steve Gaines, American singer-songwriter and guitarist (d. 1977)
  1949   – Ed King, American guitarist and songwriter (d. 2018)
  1949   – Tommy Seebach, Danish singer-songwriter, pianist, and producer (d. 2003)
  1949   – Fred "Sonic" Smith, American guitarist and songwriter (d. 1994)
  1949   – Eikichi Yazawa, Japanese singer-songwriter
1950 – Paul Kossoff, English guitarist and songwriter (d. 1976)
  1950   – Masami Kuwashima, Japanese race car driver
  1950   – Mike Nifong, American lawyer and politician
  1950   – John Steptoe, American author and illustrator (d. 1989)
1951 – Volodymyr Melnykov, Ukrainian poet, writer, songwriter and composer
1953 – Tom Cora, American cellist and composer (d. 1998)
  1953   – Judy Playfair, Australian swimmer
1954 – Barry Cowsill, American singer-songwriter, keyboard player, and producer (d. 2005)
  1954   – David Wojnarowicz, American painter and photographer (d. 1992)
1955 – Steve Berlin, American saxophonist, keyboard player, and producer
  1955   – Geraldine Brooks, Australian-American novelist and journalist
  1955   – William Jackson, Scottish harp player and composer
  1955   – Edu Manzano, American-Filipino actor and politician
1956 – Paul Allott, English cricketer and sportscaster
  1956   – Kostas Karamanlis, Greek lawyer and politician, 181st Prime Minister of Greece
  1956   – Nathalie Roussel, French actress
  1956   – Ray Wilkins, English footballer and manager (d. 2018)
  1956   – Lefteris Zagoritis, Greek lawyer and politician
1957 – Tim Wallach, American baseball player and coach
  1957   – Kepler Wessels, South African cricketer, coach, and sportscaster
1958 – Paul Clark, English footballer and manager
  1958   – Jeff Crowe, New Zealand cricketer, referee, and manager
  1958   – Arlindo Cruz, Brazilian singer-songwriter
  1958   – Beth Nielsen Chapman, American singer-songwriter
1959 – John Berry, American singer-songwriter and guitarist
  1959   – Morten Harket, Norwegian singer-songwriter
  1960   – Ronald Lengkeek, Dutch footballer
1960 – Melissa Leo, American actress
  1960   – Callum Keith Rennie, English-Canadian actor and producer
1961 – Freeman Mbowe, Tanzanian politician
  1961   – Wendy Thomas, American businesswoman
1962 – Robert Herjavec, Croatian-Canadian businessman
  1962   – Tom Kurvers, American ice hockey player and sportscaster (d. 2021)
  1962   – Nick Botterill, British business man
  1962   – Bonnie Jo Campbell, American novelist and short story writer
1963 – Robin Singh, Trinidadian-Indian cricketer and coach
1964 – Faith Ford, American actress
1965 – Emily Bell, English journalist and academic
  1965   – Dmitry Medvedev, Russian lawyer and politician, 3rd President of Russia
  1965   – Kevin O'Hare, English ballet dancer and director
1966 – Aamer Sohail, Pakistani cricketer and politician
1967 – Jens Lien, Norwegian director, producer, and screenwriter
  1967   – John Power, English singer-songwriter and guitarist
1968 – Grant Shapps, English politician
  1968   – Michelle Stafford, American actress, producer, and screenwriter
1969 – Denis Betts, English rugby league player and coach
  1969   – Konstandinos Koukodimos, Australian-Greek long jumper and politician
1970 – Francesco Casagrande, Italian cyclist
  1970   – Ben Garant, American actor, director, producer, and screenwriter
  1970   – Satoshi Kojima, Japanese wrestler
  1970   – Jason Martin, Australian rugby league player, singer, and guitarist
  1970   – Craig Montoya, American singer-songwriter and bass player
  1970   – Mark Webber, English guitarist
1971 – Jeff Loomis, American guitarist and songwriter
  1971   – Andre Matos, Brazilian singer-songwriter and pianist (d. 2019)
  1971   – Christopher McCulloch, American voice actor, producer, and screenwriter
  1971   – Kimberly Williams-Paisley, American actress, director, and producer
1972 – Notah Begay III, American golfer
  1972   – David Bell, American baseball player and coach
1973 – Tony Bui, Vietnamese director, producer, and screenwriter
  1973   – Terrell Fletcher, American football player
  1973   – Andrew Lincoln, English actor
  1973   – Nas, American rapper
  1973   – Linvoy Primus, English footballer
  1973   – Mike Ward, Canadian comedian and actor
1974 – Chad Bradford, American baseball player
  1974   – Hicham El Guerrouj, Moroccan runner
  1974   – Mattias Marklund, Swedish guitarist
  1974   – Sunday Oliseh, Nigerian footballer and manager
  1974   – Helgi Sigurðsson, Icelandic footballer
  1974   – Patrick van Balkom, Dutch sprinter
1976 – Agustín Calleri, Argentinian tennis player
  1976   – Kevin Lyttle, Vincentian soca artist
1977 – Mattias Agabus, Estonian architect
  1977   – Malik Bendjelloul, Swedish director and producer (d. 2014)
  1977   – Miyu Matsuki, Japanese voice actress and singer (d. 2015)
1978 – Ben Cohen, English rugby union player
  1978   – Ron DeSantis, American politician, 46th Governor of Florida
  1978   – Carmen Kass, Estonian model and actress
  1978   – Danielle Peck, American singer-songwriter
1979 – Ivica Olić, Croatian footballer
  1979   – Stefan Stam, Dutch footballer
1980 – Ayọ, German singer-songwriter and actress
  1980   – Gareth Maybin, Northern Irish professional golfer
1981 – Miyavi, Japanese singer-songwriter, guitarist, and producer
  1981   – Katie Lee, American chef, author, and critic
  1981   – Stefan Reisinger, German footballer
  1981   – Yumi Adachi, Japanese actress and singer
1982 – SoShy, French-American singer-songwriter
  1982   – Petr Průcha, Czech ice hockey player
1983 – Arash Borhani, Iranian footballer
  1983   – Josh Outman, American baseball player
  1983   – Frostee Rucker, American football player
  1983   – Amy Winehouse, English singer-songwriter (d. 2011)
1984 – Ayushmann Khurrana, Indian film actor, singer and anchor
1985 – Alex Clare, English singer and songwriter
  1985   – Paolo Gregoletto, American bass player and songwriter
  1985   – Trevis Smith, American football player
  1985   – Aya Ueto, Japanese actress and singer
  1985   – Delmon Young, American baseball player
1986 – Jonathan Monaghan, American director, producer, and screenwriter
  1986   – Steven Naismith, Scottish footballer
  1986   – Barış Özbek, German-Turkish footballer
  1986   – Alan Sheehan, Irish footballer
  1986   – Ai Takahashi, Japanese singer and actress
1987 – Michael Crabtree, American football player
  1987   – Tinchy Stryder, Ghanaian-English rapper and producer
1988 – Martin Fourcade, French biathlete
  1988   – Diogo Salomão, Portuguese footballer
1989 – Jessica Brown Findlay, English actress
  1989   – Jimmy Butler, American basketball player
  1989   – Tony Finau, American golfer
  1989   – Logan Henderson, American singer-songwriter
  1989   – Jesse James, American actor
  1989   – Lee Jong-suk, South Korean actor and model
  1989   – Miriam Zetter, Mexican ten-pin bowler
1990 – Douglas Costa, Brazilian footballer
  1990   – Petar Filipović, German-born Croatian footballer
  1990   – Belinda Hocking, Australian backstroke swimmer
  1990   – Cecilie Pedersen, Norwegian footballer
1991 – Dee Milliner, American football player
  1991   – Nana, South Korean singer, actress and model
  1991   – Shayne Topp, American actor and Smosh cast member
1992 – Connor Fields, American cyclist
  1992   – Zico, South Korean rapper
1993 – Brandon Brown, American race car driver
1994 – Brahim Darri, Dutch footballer
  1994   – Gary Harris, American basketball player
  1994   – Daniel O'Shaughnessy, Finnish footballer
  1994   – Krasimir Stanoev, Bulgarian footballer
1995 – Deshaun Watson, American football player
1996 – Hugh Bernard, English cricketer
  1996   – Myles Wright, English professional footballer
1997 – Benjamin Ingrosso, Swedish singer and songwriter

Deaths

Pre-1600
AD 23 – Drusus Julius Caesar, Roman son of Tiberius (b. 13 BC)
 258 – Cyprian, African bishop and saint (b. 200)
 407 – John Chrysostom, Byzantine archbishop and saint (b. 347)
 585 – Bidatsu, emperor of Japan (b. 538)
 619 – Yang You, emperor of the Sui Dynasty (b. 605)
 775 – Constantine V, Byzantine emperor (b. 718)
 786 – Al-Hadi, Abbasid caliph (b. 764)
 820 – Li Yong, chancellor of the Tang Dynasty
 891 – Stephen V, pope of the Catholic Church
 919 – Niall Glúndub, High King of Ireland
 927 – Cele Dabhaill mac Scannal, Irish abbot
 949 – Fujiwara no Tadahira, Japanese statesman (b. 880)
1146 – Imad ad-Din Zengi, Syrian ruler (b. 1087)
1164 – Emperor Sutoku of Japan (b. 1119)
1214 – Albert Avogadro, Italian lawyer, patriarch, and saint (b. 1149)
1321 – Dante Alighieri, Italian writer (b. 1265)
1401 – Dobrogost of Nowy Dwór, Polish bishop (b. 1355)
1404 – Albert IV, duke of Austria (b. 1377)
1412 – Ingegerd Knutsdotter, Swedish abbess (b. 1356)
1435 – John of Lancaster, 1st Duke of Bedford, English politician, Lord High Admiral (b. 1389)
1487 – Mara Branković, Serbian princess (b. 1416)
1523 – Pope Adrian VI (b. 1459)
1538 – Henry III of Nassau-Breda (b. 1483)

1601–1900
1605 – Jan Tarnowski, Polish archbishop (b. 1550)
1613 – Thomas Overbury, English poet
1638 – John Harvard, English-American minister and philanthropist (b. 1607)
1646 – Robert Devereux, 3rd Earl of Essex, English general and politician, Lord Lieutenant of Staffordshire (b. 1591)
1712 – Giovanni Domenico Cassini, Italian-French mathematician, astronomer, and engineer (b. 1625)
1715 – Dom Pérignon, French monk and priest (b. 1638)
1743 – Nicolas Lancret, French painter (b. 1690)
1749 – Richard Temple, 1st Viscount Cobham, English field marshal and politician, Lord Lieutenant of Buckinghamshire (b. 1675)
1759 – Louis-Joseph de Montcalm, French general (b. 1712)
1807 – George Townshend, 1st Marquess Townshend, English field marshal and politician, Lord Lieutenant of Ireland (b. 1724)
1821 – Heinrich Kuhl, German naturalist and zoologist (b. 1797)
1836 – Aaron Burr, American colonel and politician, 3rd Vice President of the United States (b. 1756)
1851 – James Fenimore Cooper, American novelist, short story writer, and historian (b. 1789)
1852 – Augustus Pugin, English architect and critic, designed Scarisbrick Hall (b. 1812)
  1852   – Arthur Wellesley, 1st Duke of Wellington, Irish-English field marshal and politician, Prime Minister of the United Kingdom (b. 1769)
1862 – Charles Pearson, English lawyer and politician (b. 1793)
  1862   – Charles Lennox Richardson, English-Chinese merchant (b. 1834)
1879 – Bernhard von Cotta, German geologist and author (b. 1808)
1891 – Johannes Bosboom, Dutch painter (b. 1817)
1898 – William Seward Burroughs I, American businessman, founded the Burroughs Corporation (b. 1857)

1901–present
1901 – William McKinley, American soldier, lawyer, and politician, 25th President of the United States (b. 1843)
1905 – Pierre Savorgnan de Brazza, Italian-French explorer (b. 1852)
1910 – Lombe Atthill, Northern Irish obstetrician and gynaecologist (b. 1827)
1916 – José Echegaray, Spanish engineer, mathematician, and playwright, Nobel Prize laureate (b. 1832)
1927 – Isadora Duncan, American-Russian dancer and choreographer (b. 1877)
1931 – Tom Roberts, English-Australian painter and educator (b. 1856)
1936 – Ossip Gabrilowitsch, Russian-American pianist and conductor (b. 1878)
  1936   – Irving Thalberg, American screenwriter and producer (b. 1899)
1937 – Tomáš Garrigue Masaryk, Czech sociologist and politician, 1st President of Czechoslovakia (b. 1850)
1942 – E. S. Gosney, American eugenicist and philanthropist, founded Human Betterment Foundation (b. 1855)
1951 – Fritz Busch, German conductor and director (b. 1890)
1952 – John McPhee, Australian businessman and politician, 27th Premier of Tasmania (b. 1874)
1959 – Wayne Morris, American actor, singer, and producer (b. 1914)
1960 – M. Karagatsis, Greek author, playwright, and critic (b. 1908)
1961 – Ernst Gustav Kühnert, Estonian-German architect and historian (b. 1885)
1962 – Frederick Schule, American hurdler, football player, and coach (b. 1879)
1965 – J. W. Hearne, English cricketer (b. 1891)
1966 – Gertrude Berg, American actress and screenwriter (b. 1899)
  1966   – Hiram Wesley Evans, American Ku Klux Klan leader (b. 1881)
  1966   – Cemal Gürsel, Turkish general and politician, 4th President of Turkey (b. 1895)
1975 – Walter Herbert, German-American conductor (b. 1902)
1979 – Nur Muhammad Taraki, Afghan journalist and politician, 3rd President of Afghanistan (b. 1917)
1981 – Furry Lewis, American singer-songwriter and guitarist (b. 1899)
  1981   – William Loeb III, American publisher (b. 1905)
1982 – Christian Ferras, French violinist (b. 1933)
  1982   – John Gardner, American novelist, essayist, and critic (b. 1933)
  1982   – Bachir Gemayel, Lebanese commander and politician (b. 1947)
  1982   – Grace Kelly, American-Monegasque actress; Princess of Monaco (b. 1929)
1984 – Janet Gaynor, American actress (b. 1906)
1986 – Gordon McLendon, American broadcaster, founded the Liberty Broadcasting System (b. 1921)
1989 – Pérez Prado, Cuban-Mexican singer-songwriter and pianist (b. 1916)
1991 – Julie Bovasso, American actress and playwright (b. 1930)
  1991   – Russell Lynes, American historian, photographer, and author (b. 1910)
1992 – August Komendant, Estonian-American engineer and academic (b. 1906)
  1992   – Paul Martin Sr., Canadian lawyer and politician, 12th Canadian Minister of Foreign Affairs (b. 1903)
1994 – Marika Krevata, Greek actress (b. 1910)
1995 – Maurice K. Goddard, American colonel and politician (b. 1912)
1996 – Juliet Prowse, Indian-South African actress, singer, and dancer (b. 1937)
1998 – Yang Shangkun, Chinese politician, and 4th President of China (b. 1907)
1999 – Charles Crichton, English director, producer, and screenwriter (b. 1910)
  1999   – Giannos Kranidiotis, Greek politician and diplomat (b. 1947)
2000 – Beah Richards, American actress (b. 1920)
  2000   – Jerzy Giedroyc, Belarusian-Polish soldier and activist (b. 1906)
2001 – Stelios Kazantzidis, Greek singer and guitarist (b. 1931)
2002 – LaWanda Page, American actress (b. 1920)
2003 – Jerry Fleck, American actor and director (b. 1947)
  2003   – Garrett Hardin, American ecologist and author (b. 1915)
  2003   – John Serry, Sr., American accordion player and composer (b. 1915)
2005 – William Berenberg, American physician and academic (b. 1915)
  2005   – Vladimir Volkoff, French soldier and author (b. 1932)
  2005   – Robert Wise, American director and producer (b. 1914)
2006 – Mickey Hargitay, Hungarian-American bodybuilder and actor (b. 1926)
  2006   – Esme Melville, Australian actress (b. 1918)
2007 – Jacques Martin, French television host and producer (b. 1933)
  2007   – Robert Savoie, Canadian opera singer (b. 1927)
2008 – Hyman Golden, American businessman, co-founded Snapple (b. 1923)
2009 – Keith Floyd, English chef and author (b. 1943)
  2009   – Henry Gibson, American actor (b. 1935)
  2009   – Jody Powell, American diplomat, White House Press Secretary (b. 1943)
  2009   – Patrick Swayze, American actor, singer, and dancer (b. 1952)
2011 – Malcolm Wallop, American politician (b. 1933)
2012 – Jacques Antoine, French game show producer, created The Crystal Maze and Fort Boyard (b. 1924)
  2012   – Eduardo Castro Luque, Mexican businessman and politician (b. 1963)
  2012   – Winston Rekert, Canadian actor and director (b. 1949)
  2012   – Kan Yuet-keung, Hong Kong banker, lawyer, and politician (b. 1913)
2013 – Maksym Bilyi, Ukrainian footballer (b. 1989)
  2013   – Osama El-Baz, Egyptian soldier and diplomat (b. 1931)
  2013   – Faith Leech, Australian swimmer (b. 1941)
2014 – Tony Auth, American illustrator (b. 1942)
  2014   – Peter Gutteridge, New Zealand singer-songwriter and guitarist (b. 1961)
  2014   – E. Jennifer Monaghan, English-American historian, author, and academic (b. 1933)
2015 – Davey Browne, Australian boxer (b. 1986)
  2015   – Fred DeLuca, American businessman, co-founded Subway (b. 1947)
  2015   – Martin Kearns, English drummer (b. 1977)
  2015   – Corneliu Vadim Tudor, Romanian journalist and politician (b. 1949)
2018 – Ethel Johnson, American professional wrestler (b. 1935)
  2018   – Zienia Merton, British actress (b. 1945)
2021 – Norm Macdonald, Canadian comedian and actor (b. 1959)

Holidays and observances
Christian feast day:
Aelia Flaccilla (Eastern Orthodox Church)
Cormac mac Cuilennáin (or of Cashel)
Crescentius of Rome
Feast of the Cross (Christianity)
Elevation of the Holy Cross (Eastern Orthodox)
Lord of Miracles of Buga
Louis Gabriel Taurin Dufresse (one of Martyr Saints of China)
Maternus of Cologne
Notburga
September 14 (Eastern Orthodox liturgics)
Engineer's Day (Romania)
Hindi Day (Hindi-speaking states of India)
Mobilized Servicemen Day (Ukraine)
San Jacinto Day (Nicaragua)

References

External links

 
 
 

Days of the year
September